Cobain's Diary is the third studio album by Detroit rap artist King Gordy.

Track listing

References

King Gordy albums
2007 albums